The following is the final results of the 1981 World Wrestling Championships. Freestyle competition were held in Skopje, Yugoslavia (present-day North Macedonia) and Greco-Roman competition were held in Oslo, Norway.

Medal table

Team ranking

Medal summary

Men's freestyle

Men's Greco-Roman

References
FILA Database

World Wrestling Championships
World Wrestling Championships
International sports competitions hosted by North Macedonia
W
W
W
World Wrestling Championships
World Wrestling Championships
World Wrestling Championships